Brightness is an attribute of visual perception in which a source appears to be radiating or reflecting light. In other words, brightness is the perception elicited by the luminance of a visual target. The perception is not linear to luminance, and relies on the context of the viewing environment (for example, see White's illusion).

Brightness refers to how much light appears to shine from something. This is a different perception than lightness, which is how light something appears compared to a similarly lit white object.

The adjective  bright derives from an Old English beorht with the same meaning via metathesis giving Middle English briht. The word is from a Common Germanic , ultimately from a PIE root with a closely related meaning, * "white, bright".
"Brightness" was formerly used as a synonym for the photometric term luminance and (incorrectly) for the radiometric term radiance. As defined by the US Federal Glossary of Telecommunication Terms (FS-1037C), "brightness" should now be used only for non-quantitative references to physiological sensations and perceptions of light.

With regard to stars, brightness is quantified as apparent magnitude and absolute magnitude.

Brightness is an antonym of dimness or dullness.

New meaning

The United States Federal Trade Commission (FTC) has assigned an unconventional meaning to brightness when applied to lamps.  When appearing on light bulb packages, brightness means luminous flux, while in other contexts it means luminance.  Luminous flux is the total amount of light coming from a source, such as a lighting device.  Luminance, the original meaning of brightness, is the amount of light per solid angle coming from an area, such as the sky.  The table below shows the standard ways of indicating the amount of light.

See also
 Brightness (sound)
 Luma (video)
 Luminance (relative)
 Luminosity
 The difference between luminescence and brightness is practically exploited by prism lighting

Notes

External links

 Poynton's Color FAQ

Vision
Photometry

hu:Világosság